Kanchan may refer to:

Surname
Ilias Kanchan, Bangladeshi film actor

Given name
Kanchan, stage name of Kumari Kanchan Dinkerao Mail (1950–2004), Indian singer with Babla & Kanchan
Kanchan (actress) (born 1970), Indian entertainer and model
Kanchan Amatya (born circa 1997), Nepalese women's right advocate
Kanchan Awasthi, Indian entertainer and model
Kanchan Chaudhary Bhattacharya (1947–2019), Indian Police Service officer
Kanchan Gupta, Indian journalist, political analyst, and activist
Kanchan Mullick, Bengali actor
Kanchan Prava Devi, regent of Tripura from 1947 to 1949

Other
Kanchan Kanya Express, a train route on Indian Railways
Kanchan armour, a modular composite armour
Uruli Kanchan, village near Pune, Maharashtra, India